Buggana Rajendranath Reddy (born 27 September 1970) is an Indian politician  Minister for Finance, Planning and Legislative Affairs in the government of Andhra Pradesh. He was elected as a Member of the Legislative Assembly (MLA) representing Dhone Assembly constituency in both 2019 Andhra Pradesh Legislative Assembly election and 2014 Andhra Pradesh Legislative Assembly election. From 2016 to 2019, he also served as the Public Accounts Committee Chairman of Andhra Pradesh.

Early life
Buggana Rajendranath Reddy was born in Bethamcherla of Kurnool district, Andhra Pradesh, to Buggana Ramnath Reddy (Sarpanch to Bethamcherla, Kurnool District, Andhra Pradesh) and Buggana Parvathi Devi. His maternal grandfather, K. V. Reddy, was a prominent Indian film maker.

Buggana Rajendranath did his schooling at The Hyderabad Public School, Begumpet and pursued his high school education at Madras Christian College, Chennai. He later graduated as Bachelor of Engineering in Computer Science from Vijayanagar Engineering College, Bellary, in 1992.

Career

References

YSR Congress Party politicians
Living people
1970 births
People from Rayalaseema
Lok Sabha members from Andhra Pradesh
YSR Congress Party
Indian engineers
Government of Andhra Pradesh
Andhra Pradesh MLAs 2014–2019
Andhra Pradesh MLAs 2019–2024